Muhammad Hammad (born 15 August 1997) is an Indian professional footballer who plays as a defender for Real Kashmir FC in the I-League.

Career

Hammad was born and brought up in Jammu & Kashmir, and he started his youth career from 2nd Division I league Club Lonestar Kashmir F.C. He also represented Jammu & Kashmir in the Santosh Trophy 2015–2016 before joining Real Kashmir FC. Hammad was also a part of the JK state team in the U19 national state competition. He won the prestigious I-League 2nd Division with Real Kashmir FC.

References

Further reading
 'Real Kashmir FC express happiness after being promoted to I-League', ANI, Jun 02, 2018
 'For path-breaker Real Kashmir players, football more than just a means of livelihood', Times of India, Jun 03, 2018
 'Kashmir FC brave curfews and bad conditions to become the real deal', Mid Day, Jun 03, 2018
 'Cash-strapped, curfew-bound: Real Kashmir’s unreal story', Times of India, Jun 14, 2018
 'Of floods, curfew and football – Real Kashmir', Sportstar, The Hindu, Oct 10, 2018
 'I-League: It’s come home as Real Kashmir face Churchill Brothers', Indian Express, Nov 06, 2018
 'Danish, Hammad & Shahnawaz: The Local Heroes of Real Kashmir FC', The Quint, Nov 11, 2018
 'Real Kashmir FC: The underdog football team scaling heights', Aljazeera, Nov 19, 2018
 'Ascent of Real Kashmir football team gives a weary region reason to cheer', Business Standard, Jan 25, 2019
 'The Kashmiri football fairy tale', Live Mint, Jan 25, 2019
 'The amazing Real Kashmir FC story', Rediff Sports, Feb 05, 2019

External links
 

Living people
1997 births
Indian footballers
Association football defenders
Real Kashmir FC players
I-League players
People from Srinagar
Footballers from Jammu and Kashmir